Temple Beth-El is a synagogue located in Birmingham, Alabama. Founded in 1907, Temple Beth-El is a member of the United Synagogue of Conservative Judaism. Temple Beth-El is the only Conservative-affiliated synagogue in Birmingham, and one of only four Conservative synagogues in Alabama.

Hillel Norry joined as interim rabbi in June 2021. He served through July 2022 when Stephen Henkin became rabbi. The current music and youth director is Sarah Metzger.

History
The first Jews arrived in Birmingham in 1873. They were attracted there by potential business opportunities in this burgeoning coal and ore center of the South. In 1881, a dozen families gathered for the first Rosh Hashanah services which were held in a private home. The 1880s saw a great influx of Jewish newcomers to Birmingham. In 1882, Temple Emanu-El was formally incorporated. With a membership of 100 families, the Reform congregation dedicated its first synagogue building in 1889.

An embryonic Orthodox congregation, Knesseth Israel, erected its first synagogue in 1903 to serve the large number of immigrants coming from Eastern Europe. The third synagogue in Birmingham, Temple Beth-El, was chartered in 1907 as a second Orthodox-affiliated congregation. This group became a part of the Conservative movement in 1944.

Temple Beth-El's current sanctuary was built in 1926 and the facility is located at 2179 Highland Avenue on the Southside of Birmingham. Renovations in the 1990s added a cultural center and classrooms, and further renovations were completed in the 2000s (decade) to the sanctuary, chapel, and social hall. Temple Beth-El is one of the few Conservative synagogues in the United States to have its own mikvah.

Currently, Temple Beth-El serves approximately 600-700 Jewish families in the Birmingham area. Other affiliations include a chapter of Sisterhood (affiliated with the national Women's League for Conservative Judaism), a Men's Club (affiliated with the Federation of Jewish Men's Clubs) and youth groups active within the umbrella organization United Synagogue Youth. Hillel Norry joined as interim rabbi in June 2021.

Involvement in the Civil Rights era
The 1950s and 1960s were a period of upheaval in Birmingham as protesters and police often clashed in the streets during the civil rights movement. This was unfortunately also a time when bombings of religious institutions were common.

On April 28, 1958, 54 sticks of dynamite were placed outside Temple Beth-El in a bombing attempt. According to police reports, the burning fuses were doused by heavy rainfall, preventing the dynamite from exploding.

Although the crime was never solved, police considered Bobby Frank Cherry, later convicted of bombing the Sixteenth Street Baptist Church, to be a suspect.

See also
Temple Emanu-El (Birmingham, Alabama)

References

External links

 Temple Beth-El

20th-century attacks on synagogues and Jewish communal organizations in the United States
Religious buildings and structures in Birmingham, Alabama
Culture of Birmingham, Alabama
History of Alabama
Jews and Judaism in Appalachia
Jewish organizations established in 1907
Civil rights movement
Conservative synagogues in the United States
Synagogues in Alabama
1907 establishments in Alabama
Synagogues completed in 1926